"Thug Holiday" is a song by American rapper Trick Daddy and the second single from his fifth studio album of the same name (2002). It features American singer LaTocha Scott of the R&B group Xscape. The song was produced by David Banner.

Composition
A piano-driven track, "Thug Holiday" sees Trick Daddy rapping about the issues of life in the ghetto, and putting his guns away and praying for people who are affected by the consequences of the "thug life". Trick also addresses everyday conflicts that people face, such as inequality and violence.

Charts

References

2002 singles
2002 songs
Trick Daddy songs
Songs written by Trick Daddy
Atlantic Records singles
Songs written by LaTocha Scott
Songs written by David Banner